

The following lists events that happened during 1945 in Afghanistan.

There is little change in internal affairs as Zahir Shah continues a peaceful rule and the end of World War II sees an unbroken record of neutrality for the country. During the year, Ely Palmer, formerly with the foreign service at the Australian embassy, succeeds Cornelius Van H. Engert as U.S. minister at Kabul.

Incumbents
 Monarch – Mohammed Zahir Shah
 Prime Minister – Mohammad Hashim Khan

July 1945
The Red Crescent Society of Afghanistan donates £5,000 to the fund opened by the International Red Cross at Geneva as a token of its sympathy with the fate of European peoples.

References 

 
Afghanistan
Years of the 20th century in Afghanistan
Afghanistan
1940s in Afghanistan